Renal urea handling is the part of renal physiology that deals with the reabsorption and secretion of urea. Movement of large amounts of urea across cell membranes is made possible by urea transporter proteins.

Urea allows the kidneys to create hyperosmotic urine (urine that has more ions in it - is "more concentrated" - than that same person's blood plasma). Preventing the loss of water in this manner is important if the person's body must save water in order to maintain a suitable blood pressure or (more likely) in order to maintain a suitable concentration of sodium ions in the blood plasma.

About 40% of the urea filtered is normally found in the final urine, since there is more reabsorption than secretion along the nephron.

It is regulated by antidiuretic hormone, which controls the amount reabsorbed in the collecting duct system and secreted into the loop of Henle.

Overview table

References

Renal physiology